Restituta Joseph Kemi  (born 30 July 1971 in Singida) is a Tanzanian long-distance runner. She twice carried the flag for Tanzania at the opening ceremony of the Summer Olympics: in 2000 and 2004.

She was the 1997 and 1999 winner of the Corrida de Langueux race.

International competitions

Personal bests
800 metres - 2:08.31 min (1996)
1500 metres - 4:10.01 min (2001)
3000 metres - 8:44.28 min (2001)
5000 metres - 15:05.33 min (2001)
10,000 metres - 31:32.02 min (1999)
Half marathon - 1:07:59 min (2000)
Marathon - 2:43:52 min (2001)

References

External links

sports-reference

1971 births
Living people
People from Singida Region
Tanzanian female long-distance runners
Tanzanian female marathon runners
Tanzanian female middle-distance runners
Olympic athletes of Tanzania
Athletes (track and field) at the 1996 Summer Olympics
Athletes (track and field) at the 2000 Summer Olympics
Athletes (track and field) at the 2004 Summer Olympics
Commonwealth Games competitors for Tanzania
Athletes (track and field) at the 1998 Commonwealth Games
Athletes (track and field) at the 2002 Commonwealth Games
Athletes (track and field) at the 2010 Commonwealth Games
World Athletics Championships athletes for Tanzania